The Dean of Bristol is the head of the Chapter of the Cathedral Church of the Holy and Undivided Trinity, Bristol, England. The Dean is Mandy Ford, since her installation on 3 October 2020.

List of deans

Early modern
1542–1551 William Snow (previously last prior of Bradenstoke)
1551–1552 John Whiteheare 
1552–1554 George Carew (deprived)
1554–1559 Henry Joliffe (deprived)
1559–1580 George Carew (restored)
1580–1590 John Sprint
1590–1598 Anthony Watson
1598–1617 Simon Robson
1617–1639 Edward Chetwynd
1639–1660 Matthew Nicholas (afterwards Dean of St Paul's, 1660)
1660–1667 Henry Glemham
1667–1683 Richard Towgood
1683–1684 Samuel Crossman
1684–1685 Richard Thompson
1685–1694 William Levett
1694–1708 George Royse
1708–1730 Robert Booth
1730–1739 Samuel Creswick (afterwards Dean of Wells)
1739–1757 Thomas Chamberlayne
1757–1760 William Warburton
1760–1761 Samuel Squire (afterwards Bishop of St David's, 1761)
1761–1763 Francis Ayscough
1763–1780 Cutts Barton
1763–1799 John Hallam

Late modern
1800–1803 Charles Layard
1803–1810 Bowyer Sparke
1810–1813 John Parsons
1813–1837 Henry Beeke
May–October 1837 Thomas Musgrave
1837–1850 John Lamb
1850–1891 Gilbert Elliot
1891–1916 Francis Pigou
1916–1921 Basil Wynne Willson (afterwards Bishop of Bath and Wells, 1926)
1922–1926 Edward Burroughs (afterwards Bishop of Ripon, 1926)
1926–1933 Henry de Candole
1934–1951 Harry Blackburne
–1957 Evered Lunt (afterwards Suffragan Bishop of Stepney, 1957)
1957–1972 Douglas Harrison
1973–1987 Horace Dammers
1987–1997 Wesley Carr (afterwards Dean of Westminster, 1997)
1997–2009 Robert Grimley
2009–2010 Andrew Tremlett; acting dean
2010–2019 David Hoyle
2019-2020 Michael Johnson; acting dean
3 October 2020present Mandy Ford

Sources
British History — Houses of Augustinian canons
British History — Deans of Bristol

References

Deans of Bristol
 
Deans
Dean of Bristol
Bristol Cathedral